Brian M. Rosenthal is an investigative reporter at The New York Times. He is the winner of the 2020 Pulitzer Prize in Investigative Reporting for a series on the New York taxi industry.

Early life and education
Rosenthal grew up in Indiana and graduated from Northwestern University, where he was Editor in Chief of The Daily Northwestern.

Career
Rosenthal started his career at local newspapers such as Pharos-Tribune in Logansport, Indiana, the Reno Gazette-Journal, The Seattle Times and The Orange County Register.

In 2011, he returned to The Seattle Times to cover education and the state house. His year-long series on Washington state's mental-health system spurred significant reforms and was cited in a landmark state Supreme Court case. While in Seattle, he was also part of a reporting team that won the 2015 Pulitzer Prize in Breaking News for coverage of a mudslide that killed 43 people.

He joined The Houston Chronicle in 2014 as a state bureau reporter based in Austin focused primarily on government and politics, and health and human services. His 7-part series, "Denied," revealed that Texas officials had secretly, systematically and illegally denied special education services to tens of thousands of children with disabilities for more than a decade. The investigation forced the state to pass several reforms and increase special education funding by $250 million. The Chronicle was a finalist for the 2017 Pulitzer in Public Service for the series.

In 2017, The New York Times announced Rosenthal's hire as part of an effort in “further expanding its already robust investigative team."

His signature investigations are known for citing "enormous sums of interviews": “nearly 100 current and former M.T.A. employees,” or “more than 100 other psychiatrists, nurses and officials” or “more than 300 experts, educators and parents.”

Rosenthal has won two George Polk Awards, the Selden Ring Award for Investigative Reporting, and was a finalist for the Anthony Shadid Award for Journalism Ethics. He also won a national Emmy Award in 2019 for his work as a producer on a mini-documentary.

He has served since 2019 as an elected member of the board of Investigative Reporters and Editors.

References

Living people
Pulitzer Prize for Investigative Reporting winners
The New York Times writers
Northwestern University alumni
1989 births